Col d'Ornon is a mountain pass through the Dauphiné Alps in the department of Isère in France which connects the communities of Le Bourg-d'Oisans and La Mure. The climb is used occasionally in the Tour de France cycle race, including on the "Queen stage" on 18 July 2013 which finishes with two ascents to Alpe d'Huez.

Details of the climb
For the 2013 Tour de France, the climb officially starts at the village of Chantelouve from where the climb to the summit, ranked Category 2, is a further  at a gradient of 6.7%.

From the north, the climb commences  from Le Bourg-d'Oisans at La Paute in the Romanche valley.

Tour de France
The Col d'Ornon was first used in the Tour de France in 1966 when the leader over the summit was Luis Otaño. Since then, the Tour has passed the summit on eight occasions, usually as a Second Category climb, including on Stage 17 of the 2017 Tour.

Appearances in Tour de France

References

External links
The geology of the Col d'Ornon 
Official website for the Col d'Orson ski resort 
Cycling up to the Col d'Ornon: data, profile, map, photos and description

Mountain passes of Auvergne-Rhône-Alpes
Landforms of Isère
Transport in Auvergne-Rhône-Alpes